A pantyliner (also pantiliner, panty liner or panty shield, vaginal cover) is an absorbent piece of material used for feminine hygiene. It is worn in the gusset of a woman's panties. Some uses include: absorbency for daily vaginal discharge, light menstrual flow, tampon and menstrual cup backup, spotting, post-intercourse discharge, and urinary incontinence.
Panty liners can also help with girls who are having discharges and about to start their cycle.
Pantyliners are related to sanitary napkins in their basic construction—but are usually much thinner and often narrower than pads. As a result, they absorb much less liquid than pads—making them ideal for light discharge and everyday cleanliness. They are generally unsuitable for the menstruation medium to heavy flow, which requires them to be changed more often.

Pantyliners are found in an assortment of sizes, shapes, and portability options, ranging from tiny, compact liners to long, protective liners designed for heavy vaginal discharge and light days (light menstrual flow). There are even styles designed to fit with thong underwear.

Disposable pantyliners are made with a sticky adhesive on the back of the pad to hold them in place in the panties, and some styles have 'wings' which wrap around the panties, providing additional stability.

An alternative to disposable pantyliners is reusable cloth menstrual pads. Reusable cloth pantyliners come in a variety of sizes, materials, patterns, colors, and absorbencies, and are usually secured to the underwear by wrap-around wings that snap together at the ends. These are made of cotton (often organic) and can be washed and reused for years.

Gallery

Bibliography 

Feminine hygiene